Nitzan is a community settlement in Israel.

Nitzan may also refer to:

Places
 Nitzan, Astrakhan Oblast, a rural locality in Russia

People

Given name
 Nitzan Alon (born 1964), general in the Israel Defense Forces 
 Nitzan Damari (born 1987), Israeli footballer
 Nitzan Hanochi (born 1986), Israeli basketball player 
 Nitzan Haroz (fl. 1990s–2010s), Israeli musician
 Nitzan Horowitz (born 1965), Israeli journalist and politician
 Nitzan Nuriel (born 1959), Israeli brigadier general
 Nitzan Shirazi (1971–2014), Israeli footballer

Surname
 Itamar Nitzan (born 1987), Israeli footballer
 Jonathan Nitzan (fl. 2000s), Israeli-Canadian political scientist
 Meir Nitzan (born 1932), Israeli politician